Between the Devil and the Deep Blue Sea is a 1995 Belgian-French drama film directed by Marion Hänsel. It was entered into the 1995 Cannes Film Festival. The plot is based on the short story titled "Li", by the Greek poet and sailor Nikos Kavvadias.

Plot
Nikos (Stephen Rea), a sailor, learns that the company that runs his ship has gone bankrupt. For the few weeks it will take to sell the ship he is on, the ship remains off the coast of Hong Kong. It is boarded by a young beggar girl Li, (Ling Chu) who offers to take care of him in exchange for food for her and her baby brother. Though he claims to have no use for her, Nikos reluctantly agrees to the deal.

Nikos struggles with an opium addiction and regret over abandoning his girlfriend and their child. He warms to Li and her brother, treating them as surrogate children. When his final paycheck comes through he decides to return to Europe but not before bringing Li ashore for a day where he meets both her mother and father. 

Before they part Li and Nikos talk about luck and good fortune and she tells him that his luck has changed. As he boards a new ship to return home he sees that Li has given him a gold dragon embroidered on Shantung silk, the symbol Li had previously told Nikos represented luck.

Cast
 Stephen Rea as Nikos
 Ling Chu as Li
 Adrian Brine as Captain
 Maka Kotto as African Sailor
 Mischa Aznavour as Young Sailor
 Koon-Lan Law as Li's Mother
 Jane Birkin as The Woman Nikos once loved (voice)
 Chan Chan Man as Baby Zheng, Li's Little Brother
 Chow Jo as Grandfather
 Wong Wong as Grandmother
 Fow Tse as Stepfather
 Cheung Chi Ho as Sailor
 Chong Ching as Sailor

References

External links

1995 films
1995 drama films
Belgian drama films
1990s Dutch-language films
1990s English-language films
Films set in Hong Kong
Films set on ships
Belgian independent films
French independent films
Films directed by Marion Hänsel
Films scored by Wim Mertens
English-language Belgian films
English-language French films
French drama films
1995 independent films
1995 multilingual films
Belgian multilingual films
French multilingual films
1990s French films